Jan Peter Toennies (born 3 May 1930) is an American scientist and former director of the Max Planck Institute for Dynamics and Self-Organization.

Early life and education
He was born in Philadelphia, Pennsylvania to German immigrant parents. He is the grandson of sociologist Ferdinand Tönnies.

He graduated from Lower Merion High School, outside of Philadelphia in 1948, from Amherst College, with a B.A. in 1952, and from Brown University, with a Ph.D. in chemistry in 1957. During graduate school he was a Fulbright student in Göttingen 1953–1954.

Career

Prizes and special recognition

1964 Physics Prize of the Academy of Sciences, Göttingen
1983 "Fellow" of the American Physical Society
1988 Alumni Citation, Brown University
1990 Corresponding Member of the Academy of Sciences in Göttingen
1991 Gold Heyrovsky Medal of the Czech Academy of Sciences
1992 Hewlett-Packard Europhysics Prize for solid state physics
1992 Max-Planck Prize of the Germany Research Society and the Alexander von Humboldt Foundation
1993 Member of the Germany Academy of Natural Scientists "Leopoldina" in Halle, Germany
1996 Recipient of the first MOLEC Conference Award
1999 Honorary Fellow of the International Molecular Beams Symposium
2000 Honorary Doctorate in Philosophy, University of Gothenburg, Sweden
2002 Stern-Gerlach Gold Medal of the German Physical Society
2005 Kolos Medal of University of Warsaw
2006 Benjamin Franklin Medal in Physics (with Giacinto Scoles)
2007 Honorary Doctorate in Science, Amherst College, MA, USA
2013 Herschbach Award of the Dynamics of Molecular Collicions Conference Series
2015 Gold Medal of the City of Toulouse, France
2016 Gerhard Ertl Award Lecture, Fritz Haber Institute, Berlin
2022 The Enrico Fermi Prize of the Italian Physical Society (with Giorgio Benedek)

See also
Timeline of low-temperature technology
Holstein–Herring method

Monographs
 E. F. Greene and J. Peter Toennies: Chemische Reaktionen in Stoßwellen, Dr. Dietrich Steinkopff Verlag, Darmstadt, 1959 
 E. F. Greene and J. Peter Toennies: Chemical Reactions in Shock Waves, Edward Arnold (Publishers) Ltd. London, 1964
 G. Benedek and J. Peter Toennies: Atomic Scale Dynamics at Surfaces: Theory and Experimental Studies with Helium Atom Scattering, Springer, Heidelberg, 2018

References

Brown University alumni
Scientists from Philadelphia
Amherst College alumni
University of Bonn alumni
Academic staff of the University of Gothenburg
Living people
1930 births
American people of German descent
Founding members of the World Cultural Council
Lower Merion High School alumni
Members of the German Academy of Sciences Leopoldina